Seline is a village in the Starigrad municipality of Zadar County, Croatia. Seline has a population of 455 (census 2001),. The population is by and large Croatian.

The town's church was recently refurbished and sits proudly on the main square, Trg Zukve, and is called Sacred Heart Church .

Jabukovac

Above Seline lies the town of Jabukovac ('jabuka' means 'apple' in Croatian) where according to legend a Turkish merchant by the name of Jusuf who traded in gold, 800 years ago sailed to Zadar, fell in love at first sight, offered a  girl from Seline a golden apple and she took this apple and was wed to him. 

Jusuf and his wife enjoyed many years of wedded supreme bliss and jubilation traveling between Zadar and Turkey. Jusuf went on to battle and died, while the child his wife bore became the beginning of the family of Jusuf, later Croatianised to Jusup.

The old town of Jabukovac, and the road and path known as 'Put Jabukovca, 23244, Seline, Croatia' are named in honour of the Jusuf love at first sight legend.

Until 200 years ago all of Seline's inhabitants lived in the old town of Jabukovac, situated above Seline, as it was far from the sea where pirates could not see the light from their fires and was therefore more secure.

Occupations
The chief occupations include farming, livestock breeding, fishing and tourism.

Attractions
A long, shingle beach, clear sea, the shade of tamarisk, rich offer of wholesome food, dry figs, brandy, vino, oil, cheese, honey, fish and seafood make Seline a pleasant holiday resort.

Hikers and enthusiasts can find their enjoyment in nearby Paklenica National Park or in visiting old hamlets at the foot of the hill, Bucici, Jukici, Jurline, which are named after the surnames of its inhabitants in those days, all of which survive today, where traditional culture and hospitality are still cherished.

References

Populated places in Zadar County